A feral animal is an animal living in the wild but descended from domesticated individuals. 

Feral may also refer to:
Feral (comics), a Marvel Comics character
Feral (grape), a Portuguese wine grape
Feral (Mutant X)
Feral (subculture), an Australian counter-cultural movement
Feral Brewing Company, an Australian brewery
Feral child, a child that has been isolated from human contact
Feral House, an American book publishing company
Feral Interactive, a British video game company
Feral Tribune, a Croatian satirical weekly newspaper
Feral (2012 film), a 2012 short film
Feral, a 1974 book by Berton Roueché
Feral: searching for enchantment on the frontiers of rewilding, a 2013 book by George Monbiot
"Feral", a song by Radiohead from their 2011 album The King of Limbs
Feral, an Australian/New Zealand term for a low-life

See also
 Ferral (disambiguation)